Resolutions is the first solo album from Dave Hause of The Loved Ones. It was released on January 24, 2011 through Paper + Plastick and was re-released by Rise Records on March 26, 2013.

The album was recorded at Salad Days Studio in Beltsville, Maryland, and Little Eden in Asbury Park, New Jersey, during the winter of 2009-2010. The album was produced by Pete Steinkopf and features a set of musicians who were Hause's family and friends, including The Loved Ones' bass player Chris Gonzalez playing electric guitar, former bass player Michael "Spider" Cotterman playing bass, Brendan Hill of Step Ahead and The Curse playing drums and Dave's sister Melissa Hause playing piano and B3 organ.

On 12 April 2011 a video was released for the song "Time Will Tell" The video pays homage to the 1967 Martin Scorsese short film The Big Shave.

Track listing
 "Time Will Tell" – 2:57
 "Melanin" – 3:36
 "C'mon Kid" – 4:03
 "Pray For Tucson" – 3:25
 "Resolutions" – 4:03
 "Prague (Revive Me)" – 3:03
 "Heavy Heart" – 2:54
 "Years From Now" – 2:13
 "Rankers & Rotters" – 3:34
 "Meet Me At The Lanes" – 4:20

Credits
 Dave Hause – lead vocals, acoustic guitar, electric guitar, percussion
 Michael "Spider" Cotterman – bass
 Brendan Hill – drums, tambourine, percussion
 Melissa Hause – piano, B3 organ
 Chris Gonzalez – electric guitar
 Mitchell Townsend – electric guitar, lap steel
 Pete Steinkopf – electric guitar
 Ericka Pfeiffer-Hause – vocals
 Jesse Skokos – B3 organ
 David W. Hause – acoustic guitar
 Chris Wollard – vocals

Produced, engineered and mixed by Pete Steinkopf. Mastered by Stephen Egerton

References

2011 albums
Dave Hause albums
Paper + Plastick albums